General Yi Ji-bang (hangul:이지방, hanja:李之芳, October 15, 1466 – December 11, 1537) was a soldier and military person of Korean Joseon dynasties. He was appointed governor of Chongsung, Hoeryong, Uiju Countys.

During King Yeonsangun's reign and the early part of King Jungjong of Joseon's reign, he was one of the guards, along the border of the northern area of Korea. He served as Sugun Jeoldosa of Gyeongsang-jwado and Byungma Jeoldosa of Pyeongan-do. "Jeoldosa" was a term for military commanders. He was also a dispatch diplomat for China Ming dynasty.

Life

Early life 
In 1490 and 1492 he participated in expulsion operations and battle of Jurchen, in Hamgyongbuk-do and Pyeonganbuk-do. His position was senior adjutant of commander of Bukjeong. In 1493, he was appointed to commander of Seojeong, with Yi Won-jong(이원종;李元宗) and Chang Chung(장정;張珽), Yi Yun-jong(이윤종;李允宗), there was Moosa.

After he was appointed to county governor of Cheongsung(종성;鐘城) and Hoeryong(회령;會寧). there his duty was county governor, but au fond purpose was border area defense and attack of Jurchen, Kitan and bandits of border area, thieves. One of his close relatives of unknown name was a eunuch who was a bureaucrat (내시;內侍) of government official and have inside information embarrassing personal facts of King Yeonsangun. King Yeonsangun was anxious, mass dismissal a high-ranking government official and eunuch bureaucrat. He was also suspected idea of King Yeonsangun, also he with discharged. In 1504 he was reinstatement to county governor of Hoeryong.

Next in January 1509, his mother died. He took a long leave of absence from public office to attend his mother's funeral and as a mourning period. but he was his mother mourning period time, he was wrangled and beating murder of one male civilian. he was met with harsh criticism, in devout action funeral time of his mother than murder of male civilians. He was expelled. He was put in prison to a prison of Uigeumbu(의금부;義禁府), the name of a crime was in devout action of funeral time and killing civilians was funeral time of his mother.

Sometime later, he was released by order of the King Jungjong, but a great deal of criticism of mass media organization for him because of violation of the doctrine of Neo-Confucianism. So he was reappointed to county governor of Heoryong. In March 1513, he was appointed to county governor of Uiju(의주;義州). In 1516, he was appointed to Sugun Jeoldosa of Gyoengsangjwa-do, this is naval forces commander of Gyoengsangjwa-do.

Later life 
In 1517 King Jungjong was remarried with Lady Moonjung Yun of Papyong, later Queen Munjeong. The reason was Queen Janggyeong of Joseon died due to sickness after parturition, in 1515. Yi Ji-bang was appointed to Chaekbong Jucheongsa (책봉주청사;冊封奏請使), envoy suggestion for installation of the Queen. So he was dispatched to Beijing in Ming dynasty. The Joseon dynasty was volunteer for dependency China's Ming dynasty, so Joseon was King and Queen, Crown prince was appointed unto Ming dynasty.

In 1524, he was appointed to Byeongma Jeoldosa of Pyeongan-do, this is Army commander of Pyeongan-do province. He made a recommendation to the government for expulsion of moved living of horse-riding people in three border areas of the northern region, but he was attacked by Saheonbu and Saganwon, next he was discharged and in lumbers in Ungeumbu. That year he was reinstated as Army commander of province Pyeongan-do.

In 1528,on the  death of Empress Xiaojiesu of Ming dynasty, he was appointed to Jinhyangsa (진향사;進香使), vice leader of Government delegation of condolence of the Korean Joseon dynasty. So he was dispatched to Ming dynasty but on the way he fell sick, and returned to the border area. But he was rightly sharply criticized for suddenly returning to border areas. He was  expelled and in lumber of Uigeumbu. Next he was exiled in Nampo in Hwanghaenam-do.

Next, he came out into the open due to dysentery and a disease characterized by thirst, and diabetes. He wanted to quit. In 1531, he was appointed to Byeongma Jeoldosa of Province Chungcheong-do, but he was not incoming because of his illness.

After death 
His grave was at Eonju town, Gwangju in Gyeonggi Province so later, in the 20th century his grave's land was incorporated into a Seongnam city, his grave's modern address is Daejang-dong, Bundang-gu, in Seongnam city.

See also

History of Korea
Naval history of Korea
Jungjong of Joseon

Notes

References 

 연산군일기(燕山君日記)
 중종실록(中宗實錄)
 신봉승, 《실록대하소설12. 조광조의 죽음》 (금성출판사, 2007)

External links 
 Yi Ji-bang 
 Yi Ji-bang:encykorea 

1466 births
1537 deaths
15th-century Korean people
Korean diplomats
Korean military personnel
16th-century Korean people